Benjamin Trumbull (19 December 1735 – 2 February 1820) was an early American historian and preacher.

Born in Hebron, Colony of Connecticut, Trumbull graduated from Yale in 1759, and received his theological education under Reverend Eleazer Wheelock, who delivered his ordination sermon in 1760, commending him to the people of North Haven as “not a sensual, sleepy, lazy, dumb dog, that could not bark back.” He continued in that charge for nearly sixty years, his preaching being interrupted only by the Revolution, in which he served both as a volunteer and as chaplain. After the war he published a pamphlet sustaining the claim of Connecticut to the Susquehanna purchase, which influenced the decision of Congress in her favor. Yale gave him the degree of D.D. in 1796. He published Twelve Discourses on the Divine Origin of the Holy Scriptures (Hartford: Hudson and Goodwin, 1790); A General History of the United States of America; from the Discovery, in 1492, to 1792, . . . . that was intended to be three volumes, but he lived only to complete the first, Vol. I: Exhibiting a General View of the Principal Events, from the Discovery of North America, to the Year 1765 (New York: Williams & Whiting, 1810); and A Complete History of Connecticut, Civil and Ecclesiastical, from the Emigration of Its First Planters from England, in MDCXXX, to MDCCXIII (Hartford: Hudson & Goodwin, 1797), later expanded in a second edition to A Complete History of Connecticut, Civil and Ecclesiastical, from the Emigration of Its First Planters from England, in 1630, to the Year 1764; and to the Close of the Indian Wars (New Haven, CT: Maltby, Goldsmith, & Co. and Samuel Wadsworth, 1818). The manuscript collections from which this history is compiled are in the Yale library. His grandson Lyman Trumbull was a U.S. Senator from Illinois.

Trumbull was elected a member of the American Antiquarian Society in 1814.  AAS holds original copies of over 40 titles related to, or authored by Trumbull, as well as the manuscript of his General History of the United States He died in North Haven, Connecticut.

References

External links
 Benjamin Trumbull papers (MS 505). Manuscripts and Archives, Yale University Library. 
 
 A complete history of Connecticut: civil and ecclesiastical, from the emigration of its first planters, from England, in the year 1830, to the year 1764; and to the close of the Indian wars (2 vols.). New Haven. 1818. Volume One and Volume Two at Google Books
 

1735 births
1820 deaths
American military chaplains
American Revolution chaplains
People from Hebron, Connecticut
Yale University alumni
Members of the American Antiquarian Society
People from North Haven, Connecticut
18th-century American historians
19th-century American historians
19th-century American male writers
American male non-fiction writers
Historians from Connecticut